Fürstenberg-Weitra was a cadet branch of the princely House of Fürstenberg, originally from Donaueschingen in Swabia, in present-day southwestern Baden-Württemberg, Germany. From 1744 onwards the landgravial line resided at Weitra Castle in the Archduchy of Austria, a Renaissance fortress close to the border with Bohemia. Though the Austrian possessions were not part of the Swabian Principality of Fürstenberg, the princely family owns Weitra Castle up to today.

History

Count Frederick IV of Fürstenberg-Heiligenberg (1563–1617) had acquired the remote Weitra estates in the Austrian Waldviertel region by marriage in 1607. His grandson Herman Egon was raised to a sovereign prince by the Habsburg emperor Leopold I in 1664. After the Fürstenberg-Heiligenberg line became extinct upon the death of Herman Egon's son Prince Anton Egon (1656–1716), the Fürstenberg-Weitra branch emerged when in 1744 his heir Prince Joseph Wilhelm Ernst of Fürstenberg-Stühlingen united all immediate Fürstenberg territories in Swabia under his rule and passed the Weitra estates to his younger brother Landgrave Louis Augustus Egon. 

Upon Louis' death in 1759, the landgraviate of Fürstenberg-Weitra was partitioned between his son Joachim Egon and his brother Frederick Joseph Maximilian Augustus of Fürstenberg-Taikowitz.

Landgraves of Fürstenberg-Weitra
Louis Augustus Egon Posthumous (1744–1759)
Joachim Egon (1759–1828)
Frederick Egon (1828–1856)
John Nepomuk Joachim Egon (1856–1879)
Eduard Egon (1879–1932)
Weitra line extinct, possessions fell back to Prince Maximilian Egon II as head of the House of Fürstenberg.

See also
Landgravine Josepha of Fürstenberg-Weitra

Fürstenberg (princely family)
Counties of the Holy Roman Empire